Transcription factor II Human (transcription factor II H; TFIIH) is an important protein complex, having roles in transcription of various protein-coding genes and DNA nucleotide excision repair (NER) pathways. TFIIH first came to light in 1989 when general transcription factor-δ or basic transcription factor 2 was characterized as an indispensable transcription factor in vitro. This factor was also isolated from yeast and finally named as TFIIH in 1992.

TFIIH consists of ten subunits, 7 of which (ERCC2/XPD, ERCC3/XPB, GTF2H1/p62, GTF2H4/p52, GTF2H2/p44, GTF2H3/p34 and GTF2H5/TTDA) form the core complex. The cyclin activating kinase-subcomplex (CDK7, MAT1, and cyclin H) is linked to the core via the XPD protein. Two of the subunits, ERCC2/XPD and ERCC3/XPB, have helicase and ATPase activities and help create the transcription bubble.  In a test tube these subunits are only required for transcription if the DNA template is not already denatured or if it is supercoiled.

Two other TFIIH subunits, CDK7 and cyclin H, phosphorylate serine amino acids on the RNA polymerase II C-terminal domain and possibly other proteins involved in the cell cycle. Next to a vital function in transcription initiation, TFIIH is also involved in nucleotide excision repair.

History of TFIIH 
Before TFIIH identified it, it had several names : this factor first in 1989 isolated from liver of rat known that time as factor transcription delta it also, isolated from cancer cell known that time as Basic transcription factor 2, Also, it is isolated from yeast  known transcription factor B. Finally, in 1992 known as  TFIIH.

Structure of TFIIH 

TFIIH is a ten‐subunit complex; seven of these subunits comprise the “core” whereas three comprise the dissociable “CAK” (CDK Activating Kinase) module. The core consists of subunits XPB, XPD, p62, p52, p44, p34 and p8 while CAK is composed of CDK7, cyclin H, and MAT1.

Functions 
General function of TFIIH:

 Initiation transcription of protein- coding gene.
 DNA nucleotide repairing.

(NER)TFIIH is a general transcription factor that acts to recruit RNA Pol II to the promoters of genes.  It functions as a helicase that unwinds DNA.  It also unwinds DNA after a DNA lesion has been recognized by either the global genome repair (GGR) pathway or the transcription-coupled repair (TCR) pathway of NER. Purified TFIIH has role in stopping further RNA synthesis by activating the cyclic peptide α-amanitin.

Trichothiodystrophy 

Disease 
Genetic polymorphisms of genes that encode subunits of TFIIH are known to be associated with increased cancer susceptibility in many tissues, e.g.; skin tissue, breast tissue and lung tissue. Mutations in the subunits (such as XPD and XPB) can lead to a variety of diseases, including xeroderma pigmentosum (XP) or XP combined with Cockayne syndrome. In addition to genetic variations, virus-encoded proteins also target TFIIH.

DNA repair

TFIIH participates in nucleotide excision repair (NER) by opening the DNA double helix after damage is initially recognized.  NER is a multi-step pathway that removes a wide range of different damages that distort normal base pairing, including bulky chemical damages and UV-induced damages.  Individuals with mutational defects in genes specifying protein components that catalyze the NER pathway, including the TFIIH components, often display features of premature aging (see DNA damage theory of aging).

Inhibitors
Potent, bioactive natural products like triptolide that inhibit mammalian transcription via inhibition of the XPB subunit of the general transcription factor TFIIH has been recently reported as a glucose conjugate for targeting hypoxic cancer cells with increased glucose transporter expression.

Mechanism of TFIIH repairing DNA damaged sequence

References

External links 
 

Gene expression
Transcription factors